The University of Auckland Faculty of Science is one of eight faculties and schools that make up the University of Auckland.

Location 

The Faculty of Science houses several Schools, Departments and Institutes. These are based in various locations, including the City Campus, Newmarket Campus, Leigh Campus, Tāmaki Innovation Campus and the Grafton Campus.

In November 2013, the Faculty of Science embarked on a NZ$200m redevelopment/expansion project on its main buildings in the City Campus. Following multiple delays, the state-of-the-art Science Centre was opened in July 2017. The Faculty of Science administration office is based on level 6 of the new Science Centre. In 2018, design work has begun for the potential development of a new "Gateway building" on Symonds Street to replace the Thomas Building Complex for the School of Biological Sciences.

Divisions 
The Faculty of Science comprises the following Schools and Departments:
School of Biological Sciences
School of Chemical Sciences
School of Computer Science
School of Environment
Institute of Marine Science
Department of Mathematics
Department of Physics
School of Psychology
Department of Exercise Sciences
Department of Statistics

The Faculty of Science also hosts several research institutes and centres:
Bioinformatics Institute
Centre for Biodiversity and Biosecurity
Centre for Computational Evolution
Centre for eResearch
Centre for Green Chemical Science
George Mason Centre for the Natural Environment
Institute for Innovation in Biotechnology
The Cyber Security Foundry

Science Programs 
Undergraduate Programs
Bachelor of Science (BSc)
Graduate Diploma in Science (GradDipSci)

In 2020, the Faculty of Science will offer a new four-year programme called Bachelor of Advanced Science (Honours) (BAdvSci(Hons)), a programme that is designed for high achieving students who want to pursue postgraduate research.

Conjoint Programs
Bachelor of Arts/Bachelor of Science - (BA/BSc)
Bachelor of Commerce/Bachelor of Science - (BCom/BSc)
Bachelor of Engineering(Hons)/Bachelor of Science - (BE(Hons)/BSc)
Bachelor of Science/Bachelor of Nursing - (BSc/BNurs)
Bachelor of Music/Bachelor of Science - (BMus/BSc)
Bachelor of Property/Bachelor of Science - (BProp/BSc)
Bachelor of Science/Bachelor of Laws - (BSc/LLB)
Bachelor of Science/Bachelor of Laws(Hons) - (BSc/LLB(Hons))

Postgraduate Programs
Honours
Bachelor of Science (Honours)
Postgraduate Certificate/Diploma
Postgraduate Certificate in Information Technology
Postgraduate Diploma in Science (PGDipSci)
Postgraduate Diploma in Applied Psychology (PGDipAppPsych)
Postgraduate Diploma in Bioscience Enterprise (PGDipBioEnt)
Postgraduate Diploma in Clinical Psychology (PGDipClinPsy)
Postgraduate Diploma in Forensic Science (PGDipForensic)
Postgraduate Diploma in Operations Research (PGDipOR)
Masters
Master of Information Technology
Master of Speech Language Therapy Practice (MSLTPrac)
Master of Professional Studies in Data Science (MProfStuds)
Master of Professional Studies in Digital Security (MProfStuds)
Master of Professional Studies in Food Safety (MProfStuds)
Master of Professional Studies in Mathematics Education (MProfStuds)
Master of Science (MSc)
Master of Bioscience Enterprise (MBioEnt)
Master of Operations Research(MOR)

Doctoral Programs
Doctor of Philosophy (PhD)
Doctor of Clinical Psychology (DClinPsy)

Other Programs
Graduate Certificate in Innovation and Entrepreneurship (GradCertInnovEnt)
Graduate Diploma in Innovation and Entrepreneurship (GradDipInnovEnt)
Postgraduate Certificate in Commercialisation and Entrepreneurship (PGCertCE)
Master of Energy (MEnergy)
Masters of Commercialisation and Entrepreneurship (MCE)
Certificate of Proficiency (COP)

Official magazine
 is the official magazine of the Faculty of Science at the University of Auckland. It was first published in 2007. The magazine is published annually. The target audience of the  magazine is the alumni and friends of the faculty.

References

External links
 Official website of the Faculty of Science, University of Auckland

Science, Faculty of
Science education